Hazaribagh district is one of the twenty-four districts of Jharkhand state, India and the district headquarter located in Hazaribagh town. It is currently a part of the Red Corridor.

Etymology
The district is named after its headquarters, the town of Hazaribagh. The name, Hazaribagh consists of two Persian words, hazar meaning "one thousand", and bagh meaning "garden" - so, the literal meaning of Hazaribagh is 'a city of one thousand gardens'. According to Sir John Houlton, a veteran British administrator, the town takes its name from the small villages of Okni and Hazari – shown in old maps as Ocunhazry. The last syllable in its name probably originated in a mango-grove, which formed a camping ground for troops and travellers marching along the ‘new military road’ from Kolkata to Varanasi, constructed in 1782 and the following years.

History
There are ancient Cave Paintings in Isko, Hazaribagh district which are from Meso-chalcolithic period (9,000-5,000 BC). There is a group of megaliths found close to Barkagaon that is about 25 km from Hazaribagh town at Punkri Barwadih, which has been proven to date back to beyond 3000 BCE.

On 6 December 1972, Giridih district was split from Hazaribagh. In 1999 this happened again with the creation of Chatra and Koderma. Hazaribagh left Bihar when Jharkhand was formed on 15 November 2000. On 12 September 2007, yet another district was created from Hazaribagh's territory: Ramgarh.

Economy
Coal is the major mineral found in this district. This significant coal deposit reserves of this district include Charhi, Kuju, Ghato Tand and Barkagaon of North Karanpura Coalfield. The coal mines are the main source of livelihood for the residents of this district. People of this district are known to be very hard working.

Patratu and Bhurkunda was also coal mines areas of Hazaribagh but it is now in Ramgarh district.

In 2006, the Indian government named Hazaribagh one of the country's 250 most backward districts (out of a total of 640). It is one of the 21 districts in Jharkhand currently receiving funds from the Backward Regions Grant Fund Programme (BRGF).

Administration

Blocks/Mandals 

Hazaribag district consists of 16 Blocks. The following are the list of the Blocks in Hazaribagh district:

The district is divided into two sub-divisions: Hazaribagh and Barhi.

Hazaribagh sub-division comprises 11 blocks: Sadar, Hazaribagh, Katkamsandi, Bishnugarh, Barkagaon, Keredari, Ichak, Churchu, Daru, Tati Jhariya, Katkamdag and Dadi.

Barhi sub-division comprises 5 blocks: Padma, Barhi, Chauparan, Barkatha and Chalkusha.

There are 5 Vidhan Sabha constituencies in this district: Barkatha, Barhi, Barkagaon, Mandu and Hazaribagh. All of these are part of Hazaribagh Lok Sabha constituency.

Demographics
According to the 2011 census, Hazaribagh district has a population of 1,734,495, roughly equal to the nation of The Gambia or the US state of Nebraska. This gives it a ranking of 279th in India (out of a total of 640).
Its population growth rate over the decade 2001-2011 was 25.75%. Hazaribagh has a sex ratio of 946 females for every 1000 males, and a literacy rate of 70.48%. Schedule Castes and Scheduled Tribes make up 17.50% and 7.02% of the total population respectively.

Hindus make up 80.56% of the population, while Muslims make up 16.21%. Sarna makes 1.97% of the population, Christians are 0.99%.

At the time of the 2011 Census of India, 61.58% of the population in the district spoke Khortha, 23.59% Hindi, 7.73% Urdu and 3.48% Santali as their first language.

Politics 

 |}

Geography

See also
Hazaribagh
Charowa dam

References

External links

 Official website

 
Districts of Jharkhand
Coal mining districts in India